The Brisbane International Boat Show, the largest indoor only boat show in the Southern Hemisphere, is the flagship event of Marine Queensland.

The first show was held in 1961.
The show was last held at Brisbane Convention and Exhibition Centre, Southbank, Brisbane from 25 to 28 August 2011, where attractions included a fashion show.

See also

List of festivals in Australia
Australian Wooden Boat Festival
Sydney International Boat Show
Hillarys Boat, Dive & Fishing Show
Sydney Trailer Boat Show
Melbourne Boat Show
Brisbane Tinnie and Tackle Show
Adelaide Boat Show
Marine15 Conference
Sanctuary Cove International Boat Show
Gold Coast Marine Expo
Darwin Boat Show

References

External links

Boat shows in Australia
Events in Brisbane
1961 establishments in Australia
Recurring events established in 1961